Paul Samuel Leo (formerly Levitsky) Johnson (October 4, 1873 – October 22, 1950) was an American scholar and pastor, the founder of the Laymen's Home Missionary Movement. He authored 17 volumes of religious writings entitled Epiphany Studies in the Scriptures, and published two magazines from about 1918 until his death in 1950. The movement he created continues his work and publishes his writings, operating from Chester Springs, Pennsylvania.

He was born in Titusville, Pennsylvania on October 4, 1873, to Jewish parents who had recently immigrated from Poland. His father was a prominent Hebrew scholar, and eventually became president of the Titusville synagogue. His mother died when he was 12, and his father remarried, both of which caused him distress; he ran away from home several times.

He eventually converted to Christianity and joined the Methodist Church.

In 1890, he entered the Capital University of Columbus, Ohio, and graduated in 1895 with high honors. Records in that University's Library show him enrolled as Paul Levitsky; he then went to the Theological Seminary of the Evangelical Lutheran Joint Synod of Ohio and graduated in 1898. He pastored a Lutheran church for a short time in Mars, Pennsylvania, and was then transferred back to Columbus, Ohio, at St. Matthew's Lutheran Church, which was later razed to make way for highway infrastructure. He soon built a new church building and was noted (by the Capitol University Synod) to have baptized more people and collected less money than any other pastor in the synod.

In May 1903 he left the Lutheran Church as a consequence of changes in his beliefs, and began fellowship with the Columbus Ecclesia of the Watch Tower Society. The Lutheran Church later claimed they had disfellowshipped him for heresy, but he had already left them of his own free will. A year later, Pastor Charles Taze Russell appointed him as a Pilgrim of the Bible Student movement. He eventually served as Russell's personal secretary. In time, he became Russell's most trusted friend and advisor.

Johnson suffered a nervous breakdown in 1910 a result of withstanding dissidents from within who were challenging the teachings of Pastor C.T. Russell on questions around his understanding of the new covenant and the ransom for all.

Johnson left the Watch Tower Society when Joseph F. Rutherford took over its direction after Russell's death. He founded the Laymen's Home Missionary Movement in 1920, and served on its board of directors from 1920 until his death on October 22, 1950.

External links 
 History of various Bible Students groups, with a few notes on Pastor Johnson, Heraldmag.org
 Bible Standard Ministries, the group founded by Johnson

20th-century American Lutheran clergy
Bible Student movement
American Christian writers
Converts to Jehovah's Witnesses
Jewish American writers
American people of Polish-Jewish descent
People from Titusville, Pennsylvania
1873 births
1950 deaths